S. L. Shakdher (1918–2002) was a Chief Election Commissioner of India and former Secretary-General of 3rd Lok Sabha, 4th Lok Sabha and 5th Lok Sabha (Lower House of Parliament of India). He was Chief Election Commissioner from 1977 to 1982. He hailed from Jammu and Kashmir. He died in 2002. He was an Expert on Constitution matters and Parliamentary proceeding, he made significant contribution to adaptation and changes in Parliamentary procedures for efficient functioning of Lok Sabha. He has rich knowledge and wide experience in Parliamentary matters is symbolised by his treatise on Practice and Procedure of Parliament, co-authored with Subhash Kashyap, and other publications.

Positions held
 Secretary, Lok Sabha, 1964–73
 Secretary-General, Lok Sabha, 1973–77
 Secretary-General of the Indian Parliamentary Group

References
Kashyap, Subhash C. (1989) The Office of the Secretary-General – Monograph Series (New Delhi: Lok Sabha Sectt., pp. (25–26)

People from Jammu and Kashmir
Indian civil servants
Chief Election Commissioners of India
2002 deaths
Secretaries General of the Lok Sabha
1918 births